William Henry Walter Ballantine (1847–1911) was a British Liberal Party politician. He sat in the House of Commons from 1887 to 1895.

Samuelson unsuccessfully contested the 1885 general election in the Tewkesbury division of Gloucestershire.
He entered Parliament nearly two years later, when Ballantine was elected at a by-election in July 1887 as the Member of Parliament (MP) for the city of Coventry, following the elevation to the peerage of the Conservative MP Henry Eaton.

He was re-elected at the next general election, in 1892, but was defeated at the 1895 general election and did not stand for Parliament again.

References

External links 
 

1847 births
1911 deaths
Liberal Party (UK) MPs for English constituencies
Members of the Parliament of the United Kingdom for Coventry
UK MPs 1886–1892
UK MPs 1892–1895